Gene Norman Presents the Original Gerry Mulligan Tentet and Quartet is a compilation album by saxophonist and bandleader Gerry Mulligan featuring performances recorded in 1953 and originally released as two 10 inch LPs, one on the Gene Norman Presents label and one on Capitol.

Reception

The Allmusic review by Gregg Juke observed "For those interested in the '50s West Coast scene, or new fans looking for quintessential Gerry Mulligan, look no further than Tentet and Quartet".

Track listing
All compositions by Gerry Mulligan except where noted.
 "Westwood Walk" - 2:33
 "Simbah" - 2:57
 "Walkin' Shoes" - 3:37
 "Rocker" - 2:27
 "A Ballad" - 2:53
 "Taking a Chance on Love" (Vernon Duke, Ted Fetter, John La Touche) - 2:50
 "Flash" - 3:14 	
 "Ontet" - 3:14
 "Varsity Drag" (Ray Henderson, Lew Brown, Buddy DeSylva) - 2:20
 "Speak Low" (Kurt Weill, Ogden Nash) - 2:09 	
 "Half Nelson" (Miles Davis) - 3:00
 "Lady Bird" (Tadd Dameron) - 4:28
 "Love Me or Leave Me" (Walter Donaldson, Gus Kahn) - 3:25
 "Swing House" - 3:18

Note
Recorded at Capitol Recording Studios in Hollywood, California on January 29, 1953 (tracks 1, & 3-5) and January 31, 1953 (tracks 2 & 6-8) and in Los Angeles, California on May 7, 1953 (tracks 9-14)

Personnel
Gerry Mulligan - baritone saxophone, piano
Chet Baker, (tracks 1-14) Pete Candoli (tracks 1-8) - trumpet 
Bob Enevoldsen - valve trombone (tracks 1-8)
John Graas - French horn (tracks 1-8)
Ray Siegel - tuba (tracks 1-8)
Bud Shank - alto saxophone (tracks 1-8)
Don Davidson - baritone saxophone (tracks 1-8)
Joe Mondragon (tracks 1-8), Carson Smith (tracks 9-14) - bass
Larry Bunker (tracks 2 & 6-14), Chico Hamilton (tracks 1 & 3-5)  - drums

References

Gerry Mulligan albums
1954 albums
Capitol Records albums
GNP Crescendo Records albums